Kurt Arthur Portmann (born December 9, 1967) is an American former professional basketball player.

Career 
Portmann, a 6'11'' center, graduated from Sheboygan North High School in Sheboygan, Wisconsin in 1986. He averaged 15 points, 9.2 rebounds and 5 blocks as a senior and was named Wisconsin's Mr. Basketball by the Wisconsin Basketball Coaches Association in 1986. He was recruited by schools including Marquette, Michigan, Missouri and Wisconsin. Portmann chose the University of Wisconsin. As a member of the Wisconsin Badgers men's basketball team, he made 118 appearances (30 starts) between 1986 and 1990, averaging 4.3 points, 3.5 rebounds and .9 blocks per contest. Portmann ranked second all-time in blocked shots (102) behind Brad Sellers, when he graduated in 1990.

In the professional ranks, Portmann played for the CBA's Wichita Falls Texans from 1990 to 1993. His CBA career high were 11.2 points per game in the 1991–92 season. He played for WATCO Antwerp in Belgium in 1993–94, for KK Split in Croatia in 1994-95 and for SV Oberelchingen in Germany in 1995–96, before returning to the CBA. Portmann represented the Quad City Thunder in 1995-96 and 1996–97. He made the CBA All-Defensive Team in 1991-92 and 1995–96.

Portmann started working as Executive Associate Athletic Director for Compliance at Midwestern State University. His son Max played college basketball at the University of Maryland, Baltimore County.

References 

1967 births
Living people
American expatriate basketball people in Belgium
American expatriate basketball people in Germany
American expatriate basketball people in Croatia
Centers (basketball)
Wisconsin Badgers men's basketball players